The 1978 Arkansas State Indians football team represented Arkansas State University as a member of the Southland Conference during the 1978 NCAA Division I-A football season. Led by eighth-year head coach Bill Davidson, the Indians compiled an overall record of 7–4 with a mark of 4–1 in conference, sharing the Southland title with Louisiana Tech.

Schedule

References

Arkansas State
Arkansas State Red Wolves football seasons
Southland Conference football champion seasons
Arkansas State Indians football